Hoseynabad (also Romanized as Ḩoseynābād; also known as Ḩasanābād) is a village in Abrisham Rural District, in the Central District of Falavarjan County, Isfahan Province, Iran. At the 2006 census, its population was 1,892, in 479 families.

References 

Populated places in Falavarjan County